Frank Hull may refer to:

 Frank M. Hull (born 1948), American judge
 Frank E. Hull (1882–1968), American film editor
 Frank Montgomery Hull (1901–1982), American naturalist